Bozön is a village in the Mezitli district of Mersin Province, Turkey, where the capital city of Mezitli district is part of Greater Mersin. The population of the village was 940 as of 2012. The village is west of the city center.

References

Villages in Mezitli District